The Sistema de Radiodifusoras Culturales Indigenistas (SRCI or System of Indigenous Cultural Broadcasters), operated four experimental 10-watt FM radio stations located at Mayan boarding schools in the state of Yucatán. Each station was operated by children at the boarding schools. The stations existed from 1995 to 2019; the concessions were surrendered in June 2020.

The 10 watts allotted for the stations made them the lowest-powered permitted radio stations in Mexico; the IFT awarded a social use concession to XHPEM-FM 100.7, with 5 watts ERP, in May 2015, stripping these stations of this distinction.

Stations
Four FM radio stations were part of this program:

References

External links
 (bilingual site in Spanish and Maya)

Radio stations in Yucatán
Community radio stations in Mexico
Sistema de Radiodifusoras Culturales Indígenas
1995 establishments in Mexico
2019 disestablishments in Mexico
Radio stations established in 1995
Radio stations disestablished in 2019
Defunct radio stations in Mexico